Wang Tung-chen (5 December 1898 – 25 September 1977) was a Chinese politician. She was among the first group of women elected to the Legislative Yuan in 1948.

Biography
Wang was born in 1898. Originally from Hebei province, she attended Zhili Provincial Tianjin Women's Normal School. She subsequently graduated from Hebei Provincial Women's Teachers College and earned a degree in politics and economics at Waseda University in Japan. She became head of Shaanxi Ankang Teachers' Training College and was a political instructor for the Northwest Training Corps of the Kuomintang's .

Wang was a Kuomintang candidate in Hebei in the 1948 elections for the Legislative Yuan, and was elected to parliament. Her husband Han Chen-sheng was also elected from Hebei. The couple relocated to Taiwan during the Chinese Civil War, where she remained a member of the Legislative Yuan until her death in 1977.

References

1898 births
Waseda University alumni
Chinese educators
Members of the Kuomintang
20th-century Chinese women politicians
Members of the 1st Legislative Yuan
Members of the 1st Legislative Yuan in Taiwan
1977 deaths